Salem Swedish Methodist Episcopal Church (also known as John Fletcher Christian College Chapel) is a Methodist church complex in Kearney County, Nebraska, southwest of Axtell, Nebraska.

It was built with Late Victorian/Late Carpenter Gothic style and was added to the National Register of Historic Places in 1982.

The listing is for a complex of a church, a parsonage (1883) and a school, located on the campus of the John Fletcher Christian College and Academy.

References

Methodist churches in Nebraska
Churches on the National Register of Historic Places in Nebraska
Victorian architecture in Nebraska
Carpenter Gothic church buildings in Nebraska
Churches completed in 1883
Buildings and structures in Kearney County, Nebraska
Swedish-American culture in Nebraska
National Register of Historic Places in Kearney County, Nebraska
1883 establishments in Nebraska